Baroque chess is a chess variant invented in 1962 by Robert Abbott. In 1963, at the suggestion of his publisher, he changed the name to Ultima, by which name it is also known. Abbott later considered his invention flawed and suggested amendments to the rules, but these suggestions have been substantially ignored by the gaming community, which continues to play by the 1962 rules. Since the rules for Baroque were first laid down in 1962, some regional variation has arisen, causing the game to diverge from  Ultima.

Description
Baroque chess is usually played on a standard 8×8 chessboard with the standard Staunton design of chess pieces. The rules that follow are widely found on the internet, but other variants exist. One variant was popular among students at Cambridge University in 1974. The initial setup of the pieces is the same as in standard chess, except for two things that the players must first decide on – center counter symmetry, and corner counter symmetry.

Establishing the degree of symmetry
Center counter symmetry allows either player to decide whether to switch his king and Withdrawer ("queen") around, and then corner counter symmetry requires each player to decide which of his "rooks" will be turned upside down. (The one that remains upright is the Coordinator, and the one that is turned upside down is the Immobilizer.) After these two kinds of symmetries are determined, White moves first.

For purposes of recording the moves that are played in the game, it is sufficient to employ an algebraic form of notation, as in chess, and write the names of the pieces and the squares they are to be placed in.  For instance, 1. Kd1 & We1,  Ke8 & Wd8 (center counter symmetry), and 2. Ia1 & Ch1,  Ih8 & Ca8 (corner counter symmetry).

If the symmetry resolution phases that are usually found at the start of the game could somehow be put off for later, then one may readily see how similar they are to the castling maneuvers in chess. They have the practical function of multiplying the number of games that are possible from the initial starting position.

Moving
In Baroque, the king is the one piece alone that is limited to moving exactly one square at a time; it moves and takes just like the king in chess. All of the remaining pieces on the first rank may move like the queen, in all directions. They have this power as a matter of privilege, as they are all considered to be noble pieces. This is a kind of privilege that attaches to them at birth, that is, at the outset of the game, and is never diminished; they retain this privilege no matter where they go, except when they find themselves next to an Immobilizer (see below).

The pawns, on the other hand, move just like the rook moves in chess, unable to move diagonally. Just as in chess, pawns are the peasants of this game. Unlike chess, pawns are never promoted to another kind of piece. (There is no special square to which pawns can be moved and then promoted.)

Capturing
All the pieces except for the king capture differently from their counterparts in chess,  and all but the king and pawn have different names. The king is the only piece that captures, as chess pieces do, by moving into a square that is occupied by an enemy piece. All the other pieces capture enemy pieces in more complex ways.  Friendly pieces are never allowed to capture other friendly pieces.

Pieces

The names of the pieces and rules for movement are as follows:

The king moves and captures like a standard chess king. The objective of the game is to capture the opposing king. Fast play with a chess clock usually makes declaration of checkmate a very rare thing to achieve in actual face to face play.
The pawns (or pincers or squeezers) move like standard chess rooks. A pawn captures any opposing piece horizontally or vertically between the square to which the pawn moved and a friendly piece (i.e. there may be no gaps between any of the three pieces). This is considered a custodial form of capture because it has been likened to two men coming up on the sides of the person to be seized, and taking hold of his arms to carry him off. Pawns never capture diagonally, only horizontally or vertically. It also moves the same as the pawn in Hasami shogi.

The remaining pieces all move like standard chess queens, but have unique methods of capture.

The Withdrawer (or Retreater), represented by the queen, captures by moving directly away from an adjacent piece.
The Long-leapers, represented by the knights, capture by jumping over an opposing piece in a straight line.  A long-leaper may make multiple captures in the same line as long as each piece is jumped independently.  Those variants of Baroque prohibiting multiple leaps call this piece the Leaper, and restrict it to capturing the first enemy piece it encounters, provided the next space is empty or open.  It appears that the choice between a Long-leaper and a Single-leaper tends to affect game play by encouraging "hunkering down" and overdefending pieces, and allowing pieces to spread across the board more, with less attention to bulky blockades.
The Coordinator, represented by the unmarked rook, captures any opposing piece that is on either of the two squares found at the intersection of its own file and the king's rank, and the intersection of the king's file and its own rank; these are found after the Coordinator has moved.
The Immobilizer (or Freezer), represented by the inverted rook, does not capture anything, but immobilizes all adjacent enemy pieces.
The Imitators (or Chameleons), represented by the bishops, capture any piece by moving as a piece of the type captured would have moved to capture. Also Imitators or Chameleons immobilize enemy Immobilizers to which they are adjacent. Imitators cannot capture Imitators.  In order for an Imitator to capture an enemy king, it must begin its turn adjacent to it, and step into its square.  This is because the king is the only piece on the board that steps one square at a time, and captures by 'occupation' and 'replacement' – stepping into the enemy's square to capture it.

Diagrammed examples are indispensable to understanding the rules.

King

The white king moves Kc4-d5 delivering checkmate.  Normally it would not be possible for the two kings to be adjacent, but here the black king is unable to move due to the white immobilizer on f4, thus the d5 square is not under attack by black, and the white king is not moving into check.

Note that White could not play Kc4-d4, as that would place his own king in check from the black Withdrawer.  Capturing the Withdrawer with Kc4xd3 would result in stalemate, as black would then have no legal moves.

Pawn/Pincer

The white pawn (or Pincer) moves Pg4-d4, capturing the black Immobilizer and black pawn. The Pincer moves as the pawn in Hasami shogi.   The black Withdrawer on e5 is not captured because pawns capture only vertically and horizontally, not diagonally.  The black Imitator (Chameleon) on d3 is not captured, because there is no white piece on d2.  Finally, the black Long-leaper on g3 was safe because it moved between the two white pawns, rather than a white pawn moving to complete the custodial capture.

Withdrawer

The white Withdrawer moves Wg6-d3, capturing the black pawn on h7.  The pawn on g7 and the Imitator (Chameleon) on h6 are unaffected because the Withdrawer did not move in their respective lines, but the Withdrawer could have captured either by a move in the g-file or sixth rank respectively.  Note that the Withdrawer also gives check to the black king by threatening to move away on the d-file.

Long-Leaper

The white Long-Leaper moves Ld2-d4-d6-d8, capturing three black pieces.  It might instead have captured the black Withdrawer with either Ld2-g5 or Ld2-h6.  On the other hand, the black pawn on b2 and the black Chameleon on d1 are safe from the Long Leaper because there is no square on the opposite side on which the Long Leaper could land. Also the black pawns on f2 and g2 cannot be captured by Ld2-h2, because there is no space in between the two pawns which would allow the Long Leaper to make two separate jumps. A move of Ld2-b4 would be illegal because long leapers may not jump over friendly pieces. Some variations of Baroque forbid multi-leaping, if only because it is felt that the game is more playable if the Leaper is less powerful. By requiring the Leaper to stop its movement immediately after capturing the first piece, that objective is met.

Coordinator

The white Coordinator moves Cd4-f6, capturing black's Leaper on c6 and Immobilizer on f2.  If White had played Cd4-d6 instead, he would have captured black's Leaper and pawn.  The Coordinator threatens only pieces on the same rank or file as the friendly king.  This kind of capture can be visualized by imagining an invisible cross emanating from the square the king is sitting on, and another invisible cross emanating from the square the Coordinator arrives at.  The points where these two crosses intersect are the places where captures are possible.

Immobilizer

The white Immobilizer moves If3-d5, immobilizing five black pieces.  The black Leaper on g4, which had been immobilized, is now free to move again.

An Immobilizer can never be captured by an Immobilizer, or Imitator (Chameleon). An Immobilizer can never be captured by a king or Withdrawer unless the variation popular in Cambridge is being played, in which case the Immobilizer itself must first be immobilized.  When an Immobilizer comes into contact with an enemy Chameleon or Immobilizer, the two pieces freeze each other, after which neither can move unless the other is captured.  In the version played at Cambridge, the power of an enemy Immobilizer to arrest a friendly piece's movement is defeated when another friendly Immobilizer or Chameleon is brought up to it, effectively cancelling out each other's power to arrest movement.

Some versions of Baroque allow an immobilized piece to commit suicide, i.e. be removed from the board, in lieu of the regular move of that player.  There may be strategic reasons to open a line.  For example, after the above diagrammed move, the black Leaper on c5 may wish to commit suicide, so that the other Leaper can capture the white Immobilizer by jumping over it on the fifth rank.  White cannot hinder this plan, because the Immobilizer is itself immobilized by the black Chameleon.

Chameleon/Imitator

On the adjacent diagram, the white Chameleon moves Xg6-e6-c6, capturing all seven black pieces except the king in one move and delivering check.
It captures the black withdrawer by moving away from it.
It captures the black long-leapers by jumping over them.
It captures three black pawns by surrounding them.  (A chameleon can only capture pawns on a horizontal move or vertical move, not on a diagonal move.)
It captures the black coordinator by rank/file coordination with the white king.
It delivers check by moving adjacent to the black king.
In the Cambridge rules, this capture is not possible. The move is legal, but it captures only the two leapers, because the move is not a legal move for any of the other target pieces. In the absence of  the two black leapers, the same move would capture the other five pieces.

Variants

Maxima
Baroque played on a somewhat larger board that is mostly rectangular but for a couple extra squares that are outside the board, located at d0 and e0 just behind the king and queen's squares. A matching pair of squares are also on the other side of the board, just beyond the black king and queen (d9 and e9).  Although one objective of the game is to capture the king, an alternative objective allows depositing a piece in the pair of squares on the other side of the board.  Unlike Baroque, the king in Maxima moves like the knight in chess, making for a game with much more fluid movement of pieces.

Optima
Baroque that is similar to Maxima with additional pieces and rules.

Renaissance
As shogi is to chess, Renaissance is to Baroque—pieces may be revived and reborn. Renaissance is played on a 9×9 board with a Swapper (or Resurrector or Ankh) that moves like a queen for all ordinary purposes, but for swapping actions must move like a king, trading places with any adjacent piece (both friend or foe), never capturing it.  Consistent with the concept of the Swapper (or Resurrector) being a piece wholly incapable of killing, it can also step into any adjacent empty square, and leave behind a previously captured piece resurrected by placing it in the square just vacated.  Although, seen in that light, though the Swapper is like a piece of life, it can be transformed into a 1 square bomb when captured and readmitted to the board - but capable only of death.  Instead of moving, a bomb need merely explode to effect the destruction of both friendly pieces and enemy pieces adjacent to itself, and suiciding in the process.  The destruction of pieces in this way causes all affected to be unrevivable.

There are also two more pieces that, like the Coordinator, are not capable of unassisted capture: the Pusher and the Puller.  They can move like queens for ordinary purposes, but for the purpose of exercising their special powers, they must be adjacent to the affected piece at the start of the turn.  If they begin adjacent to a piece (regardless if friendly or foe), they can push or pull it by 1 square.  For a Pusher, the empty square on the other side must be open (except for the unusual circumstance of driving a king into an enemy piece, or an Imitator into a king.)  Although the Pushers and Pullers are not capable of capture, their pushing and pulling maneuvers can result in other pieces being forced to make captures, regardless of the captured one being a friendly or enemy piece.

Rococo
Rococo is a species of Baroque that is played on a 10×10 board for the purposes of captures, but on the inner 8×8 square just inside it for the purpose of movement. To put it another way, the outer perimeter of squares can only be entered as a result of a capturing maneuver.  In addition to the traditional Baroque pieces, Rococo has an Advancer piece that moves like a queen, but captures the enemy piece it has run up next to, stopping just short of the piece taken.  As is usual for most pieces of the Baroque family, the Advancer will not enter into the space vacated by the captured piece, it merely runs up to it, and stops short by 1 square.  Unlike the game of Renaissance described above, Rococo has a similarly named Swapper piece that moves like a queen, but trades places with the enemy it runs up to, a full queen's move away. The Rococo Swapper has the unusual property of self-destructing at will, in lieu of moving, provided it is not at the same time immobilized, with the effect of taking one enemy piece alongside it.  What sets Rococo apart from Baroque the most is the way the pawns work; they are called cannonball pawns and move like a king, stepping 1 square in all directions, or leap over any adjacent piece (friend or foe). The only way that they can effect capture is by leaping, and landing on the enemy piece. They cannot capture like a king does.  Cannonball pawns can be promoted into other pieces when they reach the other side of the board.

The pawn formations unique to the parent game, Baroque, already significantly different from traditional chess, are not seen in Rococo.  Instead, Rococo's cannonball pawns seem to hang away from enemy pieces by two or three squares, rarely coming into contact with each other without advance preparation. In both chess and Baroque, however, fine nuances in maneuvering are made possible by locking positions together, made concrete by the establishment of well-defined pawn structures. This sort of thing is lacking in Rococo.

See also
Penultima

References

External links

 Ultima by Hans Bodlaender, The Chess Variant Pages
 Rococo by Peter Aronson and David Howe, The Chess Variant Pages
 An Illustrated Guide to Ultima Pieces animated GIFs illustrate captures
 Play.Chessvariants.org the Ultima PBM Game Courier

 'Pure' Rules of Ultima (also known as 'Baroque Chess')    

 Online play at Boardspace.net, against human or robot opponents.

Chess variants
1962 in chess
Board games introduced in 1962